Arthur Alan Duncan Anderson (21 December 1939 – 27 February 2022) was a Scottish professional footballer who played as a centre half for Alloa Athletic, Falkirk, Millwall, Scunthorpe United and Hearts.

Career
Anderson joined Millwall from Falkirk in October 1959 and helped the London club to win the championship of Division Four before being transferred to Scunthorpe United in 1962. However, Anderson could not settle in England. In November 1963 he was transferred to Heart of Midlothian. Anderson was the Hearts team captain for over 200 games. After long service and 38 goals for the club, he ended his career in May 1976.

He played seven times for a Scotland XI during their 1967 tour of Asia and Oceania, playing alongside Alex Ferguson. The Scotland XI won every game with Anderson at centre-half. He was awarded a cap for the tour by the Scottish Football Association in 2020, and the SFA announced in October 2021 that five of the tour matches (all of which Anderson played in) had been reclassified as full internationals.

Personal life
Anderson died in February 2022, at the age of 82.

References

External links
 

1939 births
2022 deaths
People from Leith
Scottish footballers
Footballers from Edinburgh
Association football wing halves
Scotland international footballers
Scottish Football League players
English Football League players
Alloa Athletic F.C. players
Falkirk F.C. players
Millwall F.C. players
Scunthorpe United F.C. players
Heart of Midlothian F.C. players
Dalkeith Thistle F.C. players
Scottish Junior Football Association players